Shleep is the seventh album by Canterbury scene and progressive rock veteran and musician Robert Wyatt, released in 1997.

The album brought together a diverse range of musicians from a range of genres.  After Wyatt's largely one-man recordings of the 1980s, Shleep marked a return to featuring other artistes as on his 1970s albums.  The balance of his discography would follow suit.  The Wire named Shleep its record of the year in its annual critics' poll.

Track listing
All tracks composed by Robert Wyatt and Alfreda Benge; except where indicated

"Heaps of Sheeps"  – 4:56
"The Duchess" (Wyatt) – 4:18
"Maryan" (Wyatt, Philip Catherine) – 6:11
"Was a Friend" (Wyatt, Hugh Hopper) – 6:09
"Free Will and Testament" (Wyatt, Mark Kramer) – 4:13
"September the Ninth"  – 6:41
"Alien"  – 6:47
"Out of Season"  – 2:32
"A Sunday in Madrid"  – 4:41
"Blues in Bob Minor" (Wyatt) – 5:46
"The Whole Point of No Return" (Paul Weller) – 1:25
"September in the Rain" (bonus re-release track)  – 2:31

Personnel
Gary Azukx - djembe
Alfreda Benge - voice of the apparition, chorus
Philip Catherine - guitar
Brian Eno - synthesiser, synthesiser bass, vocal chorus
Jamie Johnson - guitar, chorus
Phil Manzanera - guitar
Chucho Merchan - bass guitar, double bass, bass drum, percussion
Evan Parker - soprano saxophone, tenor saxophone
Charles Rees - chorus
Chikako Sato - violin
Paul Weller - guitars, harmony vocals
Annie Whitehead - trombone
Robert Wyatt - voice, keyboards, bass guitar, polish fiddle, trumpet, percussion, chorus

References

External links
MP3.com album main page

1997 albums
Robert Wyatt albums
Albums produced by Brian Eno
Albums produced by Robert Wyatt